Hodge is a village in Jackson Parish, Louisiana, United States. The population was 470 at the 2010 census. It is part of the Ruston Micropolitan Statistical Area.

Geography
Hodge is located in southwestern Jackson Parish at  (32.272082, -92.726557). It is bordered to the northeast by North Hodge and to the east by East Hodge.

SR 147 intersects Highway 167 immediately north of Hodge; it leads northwest  to Arcadia.

Demographics

As of the census of 2000, there were 492 people, 238 households, and 135 families residing in the village. The racial makeup of the village was 76.83% White, 22.15% African American, 0.20% Asian, 0.41% from other races, and 0.41% from two or more races.

There were 238 households, out of which 21.8% had children under the age of 18 living with them, 43.3% were married couples living together, 10.5% had a female householder with no husband present, and 42.9% were non-families. 41.6% of all households were made up of individuals, and 21.8% had someone living alone who was 65 years of age or older. The average household size was 2.07 and the average family size was 2.83.

In the village, the population was spread out, with 20.5% under the age of 18, 6.9% from 18 to 24, 27.4% from 25 to 44, 23.4% from 45 to 64, and 21.7% who were 65 years of age or older. The median age was 41 years. For every 100 females, there were 89.2 males. For every 100 females age 18 and over, there were 89.8 males.

The median income for a household in the village was $22,237, and the median income for a family was $32,750. Males had a median income of $26,953 versus $15,893 for females. The per capita income for the village was $14,192. About 9.9% of families and 17.9% of the population were below the poverty line, including 17.0% of those under age 18 and 18.4% of those age 65 or over.

Education
Jackson Parish School Board serves the village.

Zoned schools include:
 Southside Elementary School
 Jonesboro-Hodge Middle School
 Jonesboro-Hodge High School

Notable person
Jerry Huckaby, congressman

References

Villages in Jackson Parish, Louisiana
Villages in Louisiana
Villages in Ruston, Louisiana micropolitan area